Among those who were born in the London Borough of Havering, or have dwelt within the borders of the modern borough are (alphabetical order):

A

 Andy C – drum and bass DJ and pioneer of the scene
 Tony Adams – ex-Arsenal footballer, born in Romford

B
 Kylie Babbington – EastEnders actress
 Adrian Baker – musician 
 Kenny Ball – jazz trumpeter and band leader; lived in Ardleigh Green, Hornchurch
 John Benn and William Wedgwood Benn – family of politicians, lived at Upminster in the 19th century
 Robert Bertie, 3rd Earl of Lindsey – leased Havering Palace
 Pauline Black – singer, actress and author; lead singer of ska band The Selecter
Teddy Bourne (born 1948) – British Olympic épée fencer
 Frankie Bridge – singer; currently one of The Saturdays; previously a member of S Club Juniors
 Frank Bruno – boxer; has lived in Havering
 Will Burnell – English cricketer
 Gerard Batten- Former Leader of the United Kingdom Independence Party

C
Stephen Charles – cricketer
 Joe Cole – West Ham footballer, grew up in Romford
 Anthony Cooke – of Gidea Hall, tutor to Edward VI 
 Jilly Cooper – world famous novelist, born in Romford
Dean-Charles Chapman - famous actor born in Romford

D
 Alex Day – YouTuber and singer
 Harlee Dean – professional footballer. Grew up in North Ockendon, attended Hall Mead School, Upminster. Currently plays for Brentford. 
 Richard Deane – regicide of Charles I, tenant at Havering-atte-Bower
 William Derham – rector at Upminster, Fellow of the Royal Society
 Ian Dury – rock and roll singer, lived in Upminster as a child

E
 Edward the Confessor – used Havering Palace as a retreat
 James Esdaile – lived in Upminster, was Lord Mayor of London (1777–1778)

F
 Ken Farnes – cricketer, brought up at Gidea Park
 Five Star – Denise, Lorraine, Doris, Steadman and Delroy Pearson, siblings who made up the pop group who were hugely successful in the mid-late 1980s; from Romford

G
 Augustine Garland – regicide of Charles I, owned an estate at Hornchurch
 Jimmy Greaves – footballer; once lived in Upminster

H
 Thomas Hammond – regicide of Charles I, tenant at Havering-atte-Bower
 Spencer Hawken – filmmaker and former GMTV presenter.
 Imogen Heap – musician; grew up in Havering Village
 Rochelle Humes – former member of S Club Juniors; current member of The Saturdays; television presenter of This Morning and The Xtra Factor
 Daniel Huttlestone – actor, played Gavroche in the 2012 film Les Misérables
 Karl Hyde – musician and member of Underworld, born in Bewdley but has lived in the borough for many years
 Carly Hillman – actress and singer, played Nicky Di Marco in BBC soap Eastenders and member of girl-band 'Urban Lady'

J
 James I of England and VI of Scotland – used Havering Palace as a hunting lodge
 Alex Jennings – actor, born in Romford
 Jessie J – singer; grew up in Romford before moving to Redbridge
 Ralph Josselin – curate and diarist, lived briefly at Cranham Hall in 1640

K
 Elizabeth Kucinich – peace activist and wife of a US Congressman; North Ockendon

L
Freddie Ladapo (born 1 February 1993) – footballer currently playing for Rotherham United
Frank James Lampard (born 20 June 1978) – English footballer and manager who played for West Ham United, Swansea City, Chelsea, Manchester City, New York City, and at international level for the England national team
 Thomas Littleton – of North Ockendon, Speaker of the House of Commons (1698–1700)
 Colin Lynes – former IBO world title boxer
 Andrew Lynford – actor and TV presenter; grew up in Upminster and Hornchurch 
  Harry Lennon - Professional footballer who grew up in Romford

M
 Richard Madeley – TV presenter, born in Romford
 Richard Morris – philologist, lived in Hornchurch
 Kevin Mitchell – boxer; born in Romford
 Jennifer Maidman – musician, songwriter and record producer, born in Upminster
 Millicent Martin - actor, singer, comedian; born in Romford
 Ruby Mace – footballer, born in Upminster

N
 Jesy Nelson – former member of Little Mix, 2011 winners of The X Factor
 Charlotte Nichols (born 1991), member of UK parliament for Warrington North since 2019 representing the Labour Party (UK)
 Mike Nolan – member of Bucks Fizz, winners of the 1981 Eurovision Song Contest, grew up in Rainham

O
 Billy Ocean – singer
 James Oglethorpe – married the heiress of Cranham Hall in 1743; founded the Province of Georgia, United States, and was buried in All Saints' Church, Cranham
 Martin Olley – cricketer
 Jo O'Meara – singer
 Will Ospreay – professional wrestler currently signed with NJPW

P
 Ray Parlour – former footballer
 Tony Parsons – author and journalist; born and grew up in Romford
 Alice Perrers – mistress of Edward III, lived and buried at Upminster

R

S
 Paul Sculfor – model; brought up in Cranham
 Seal (musician) – fostered in Romford from shortly after birth until age 4
Freddie Sears – footballer currently playing for Ipswich Town
Matthew Selt – snooker player
 Jonjo Shelvey – footballer currently playing for Newcastle United F.C.

T 

Stuart Taylor – former footballer (Goalkeeper)
 Russell Tovey – actor, numerous TV and theatre roles including History Boys, Gavin & Stacey, Him & Her, Flesh and Blood, Being Human and Quantico.
 Lisa Thompson - children's author

U
 Underworld – musicians who live in Romford
 Edward Upward, novelist (1903–2009) – born in Romford

W
 Ken Wallace (born 1936) – Essex cricketer
 Major Sir Tasker Watkins VC GBE PC – educated in Romford
 Cliff Williams (born 1949) – AC/DC bass player, born in Romford
 Evelyn Wood – British Army officer and recipient of the Victoria Cross, rented property at Upminster

References

Havering
People from the London Borough of Havering